Maghull railway station is a railway station in Maghull, a suburb of Liverpool, England.  It is situated on the Ormskirk branch of the Northern Line of the Merseyrail network. During the 2013/14 period, it was the tenth busiest station on the Merseyrail network and the busiest station to not provide an interchange between any other services. As of 2021/22, it is now the twelfth busiest station on the Merseyrail network and the third busiest station to not provide an interchange between other services.

History
The railway line between Walton Junction (near Liverpool) and Lostock Hall (near Preston) was proposed by the Liverpool, Ormskirk and Preston Railway, and was authorised by Act of Parliament on 18 August 1846. In October 1846, the company was leased to the East Lancashire Railway, which opened the line on 2 April 1849; among the original stations was that at Maghull.

Maghull was the last station on this branch in Merseyside before the county boundary with Lancashire, until Maghull North station opened in 2018.

Frank Hornby, the designer of Hornby model railways, lived in the Maghull area; he based the design for all railway stations for small towns and villages in the Hornby Trainset on Maghull station.

Facilities
There is a large 275-space car park situated on the site. There is also a taxi rank at the station, toilets, a shelter on the Ormskirk platform and a heated indoor shelter on the Liverpool platform.  The staffed ticket booth (open from start to end of service) is located in the M to GO shop on the Ormskirk platform and there is an automatic ticket machine on the Liverpool platform.  Train running information is provided by digital display screens, automated announcements and timetable posters. Step-free access is available to both platforms. There is a cycle rack for 6 cycles and secure cycle storage for 34 cycles.

Services
Trains operate between Ormskirk and Liverpool Central every 15 minutes during Monday to Saturday daytimes, and every 30 minutes in the evening and all day Sunday.  The station is at street level and 2 small ramps provide access to the platforms.  There is a level crossing at the south end (the only one on the Walton Junction to Ormskirk section) and a pedestrian footbridge linking each platform.

Gallery

References

External links

Railway stations in the Metropolitan Borough of Sefton
DfT Category E stations
Former Lancashire and Yorkshire Railway stations
Railway stations in Great Britain opened in 1849
Railway stations served by Merseyrail
1849 establishments in England
Maghull